Stalachtis magdalena is a species of butterfly of the family Riodinidae. It was described by Westwood in 1851, and is known from Colombia.

Subspecies
Stalachtis magdalena magdalena (Colombia)
Stalachtis magdalena cleove Staudinger, 1888 (Colombia)

References

Butterflies described in 1851
Riodininae